Punjabi tandoori cooking was born out of the clay oven known as the tandoor. According to Macveigh [2008] the Punjab tandoor originated in the local  region.  It is a clay oven and is traditionally used to cook Punjabi cuisine, from the Punjab region in Pakistan and northwestern India. It is traditional to have tandoors in courtyards of homes in the Punjab to make roti, naan and tandoori chicken. In rural Punjab, it is also traditional to have communal tandoors.

Punjabi tandoori cooking
Punjabi tandoori cooking includes:

Tandoori roti
According to Davidson (2014), "the villages of Punjab had open-air tandoors where housewives would bring their dough to be rolled into rotis by the tandooriya". Steiner (2005) states that some villages in Punjab have communal tandoors.

Lachha paratha
Lachha paratha is baked in the tandoor and is round in shape with multiple layers.

Amritsari kulcha
According to O'Brien (2013), "the Amritsari kulcha is a crisp, flaky roti made with refined flour; it is stuffed with potato, onion, black pepper, chilli, cumin, and dried pomegranate seeds (anardana) and cooked in the tandoor".

Tandoori chicken
Dishes similar to tandoori chicken may have existed during the Harappan civilization. According to archaeologist and vice-chancellor of Deccan College Professor Vasant Shinde, the earliest evidence for a dish similar to  tandoori chicken can be found in Harappan civilization and dates back to 3000 BCE. His team has found ancient ovens at Harappan sites which are similar to the tandoors so popular in the Punjab. Physical remains of chicken bones with char marks have also been unearthed.  However tandoori chicken as a dish originated in the Punjab before the independence of India and Pakistan.  In the late 1940s, tandoori chicken was popularised at Moti Mahal in Peshawar by Kundan Lal Jaggi, Thakur Dass, and Kundan Lal Gujral, who are all Punjabi as well as the founders of the Moti Mahal restaurant.

Naan
According to the New Larousse Gastronomique (2018) culinary reference book, "the Punjabi naan is a white-flour, yeasted flat bread enriched with a little ghee – its tear-shape comes from being slapped on the side of a tandoor oven and baked partly hanging vertically".

Other
 Amritsari tandoori chicken.
 Tandoori chicken kebab.

Tandoor

Punjabi tandoori cooking is cooked in a tandoor (Gurmukhī:ਤੰਦੂਰ; Shahmukhi:تندور). The tandoor in Punjab is also known as tanoor.

Design
According to Ahmed (2014), Harappan oven structures may have operated in a similar manner to the modern tandoors of the Punjab. The tandoor is traditionally made of clay and is a bell-shaped oven, set into the earth and fired with wood or charcoal reaching high temperatures. According to Hayter (1992) the original versions of the tandoor "in the Punjab, a province in the north-west of India, were sunk neck deep in the ground". He further states that modern versions can also rest above the ground. Planalp (1971) notes that "the Panjab-style underground oven known as tandur is becoming increasingly popular in New Delhi" pointing to the Punjabi style of the tandoor.

Use
According to Kenihan and Kenihan (1990)"the tandoor method of cooking ... was indigenous to the north west frontier province, now Pakistan, and the Punjab". According to Kehal (2009), the use of the Punjabi tandoor is associated with Punjabi cooking in undivided Punjab.
Punjabis have traditionally used the tandoor on a regional level to cook meat dishes and breads. The use of the tandoor is so entrenched in Punjabi culture that it forms a part of Punjabi folk songs. According to Kalra and Gupta (1986), the tandoor in the Punjab "is a social institution. In the villages of the Punjab, the communal tandoor, dug in the ground, is a meeting place."  

The use of the tandoor became popular in other regions of India, after the 1947 partition with the arrival of Punjabi refugees.  Punjabis leaving West Punjab resettled in areas such as Delhi. The cuisine of Delhi was "affected by the Punjabi influx after Partition. The clay oven (tandoor) and numerous Punjabi specialities were introduced". According to Ghosh (2016) (reciting Pant (2013)), "the rest of the country was introduced to the magic of the tandoor".

Tandoor distinguished from bhathi
The Punjabi tandoor is to be distinguished from the Punjabi bhathi, an oven, which can be made out of bricks or mud and clay and is fired from an opening on one side. The bhathi is closed at the top with a metal cover and the smoke is emitted through a cylinder.

See also
 tandoor
 Tandoori chicken
 Punjabi cuisine
 Punjabi bhatti
Punjabi Saag

Notes

References

Punjabi culture
Punjabi cuisine
Firing techniques